Michelle Pearson (born April 16, 1991) is a Bermudian rower. She placed 16th in the women's single sculls event at the 2016 Summer Olympics.  She graduated from Harvard University

References

1991 births
Living people
Bermudian female rowers
Olympic rowers of Bermuda
Rowers at the 2016 Summer Olympics
Harvard University alumni
Harvard Crimson women's rowers